William Aiken (1779 – May 5, 1831), or William Aiken, Sr., was the founder and president of the pioneering South Carolina Canal and Rail Road Company. 

Born in County Antrim, Ireland, he immigrated to Charleston, South Carolina at age 10.  He was raised Presbyterian.  He married Henrietta Watt in 1801.  They raised two children, living in 456 King Street from 1807 until his death in 1831.

The railroad was organized in a meeting at this house in 1827, and Aiken was chosen as President.  Construction of the railroad began in January 1830.
He was killed in a Charleston carriage accident caused by the train's noise frightening his horse. The railroad was completed in 1833, and was the longest railroad, at 136 miles, under one management, in the world.

A historic district comprising one of his homes and selected structures of the railway, William Aiken House and Associated Railroad Structures, was listed on the U.S. National Register of Historic Places and was further declared to be a National Historic Landmark.

Also another home of his known as the Robinson-Aiken House, which his son, William Aiken Jr., a governor of South Carolina, acquired after his death, also was listed on the National Register.  This home is also known as the Gov. William Aiken House.

Aiken is the namesake to Aiken County, South Carolina.

References

1779 births
1831 deaths
People from County Antrim
Irish emigrants to the United States (before 1923)
Deaths by horse-riding accident in the United States
Businesspeople from Charleston, South Carolina
19th-century American railroad executives
Accidental deaths in South Carolina